Impulse, in comics, may refer to:

 Impulse (DC Comics)
Kent Shakespeare
Bart Allen
Kid Flash (Iris West)
 Impulse (Marvel Comics), currently known as Pulsar

See also
Impulse (disambiguation)